Walter Dempsey (born January 9, 1944) was a Canadian football player who played for the Saskatchewan Roughriders and BC Lions. He won the Grey Cup with Saskatchewan in 1966. He played college football at Washington State University. After his CFL career, Dempsey also had a brief career in the World Football League with the Memphis Southmen and Philadelphia Bell. After his retirement from football, he owned and operated a construction company in Sacramento, California.

References

1944 births
Players of American football from Illinois
American players of Canadian football
Saskatchewan Roughriders players
BC Lions players
Memphis Southmen players
Philadelphia Bell players
Living people